St Ives East was an electoral division of Cornwall in the United Kingdom which returned one member to sit on Cornwall Council from 2013 to 2021. It was abolished at the 2021 local elections, being succeeded by St Ives West and Towednack and St Ives East, Lelant and Carbis Bay.

Councillors

Extent
St Ives East represented the east of St Ives (much of the coastal part of the town) as well as part of the village of Carbis Bay, which is shared with the Lelant and Carbis Bay division. The division covers 292 hectares in total.

Election results

2017 election

2013 election

References

Electoral divisions of Cornwall Council
St Ives, Cornwall